Torture is the twelfth studio album by American death metal band Cannibal Corpse, released on March 13, 2012 by Metal Blade Records. The album was produced at Sonic Ranch Studios by Hate Eternal guitarist Erik Rutan (an ex- Morbid Angel member).

The album entered the US Billboard 200 at number 38, selling 9,600 copies its first week.

Background
Bassist Alex Webster said about the record: "After having spent the past seven months writing and rehearsing new material, we're very excited to finally begin recording. We've had great success working with Erik Rutan on our past two albums so we've decided to work with him again, but to keep things fresh we decided on a change of location — we're returning to Sonic Ranch studios in Texas, where we've recorded several albums in the past. We are psyched to see how this combination works out — we feel it's a pairing that could result in our best album yet."

It is the first Cannibal Corpse record in eight years to feature an album cover with graphic violence (the last being 2004's The Wretched Spawn). Although unlike other Cannibal Corpse covers where two would have to be illustrated - one censored and the other featuring the usual graphic violence - Torture includes a flap over the cover that depicts its graphic violence, which can only be opened once the product's plastic seal is removed. The Japanese version comes in a standard jewel box with a slip cover case to mimic the Digipak version of the uncensored international release.

Reception

Terrorizer gave the album a four out of five rating, noting that "Rob Barrett's vicious input and a welcome return of some manic Dark Angel riffing nevertheless makes this one a pick of the bunch, next to Kill." while admitting "there are barely any surprises from seasoned death metal fans here"

Track listing

Credits
Cannibal Corpse
 George "Corpsegrinder" Fisher – vocals
 Pat O'Brien – lead guitar
 Rob Barrett – rhythm guitar
 Alex Webster – bass
 Paul Mazurkiewicz – drums

Charts

References

External links
 
 Torture at Metal Blade Records

2012 albums
Albums produced by Erik Rutan
Cannibal Corpse albums
Metal Blade Records albums
Albums recorded at Sonic Ranch